Beeruva is a 2015 Indian Telugu-language romantic comedy film featuring Sundeep Kishan and Surbhi in the lead roles and directed by Kanmani. The film was later dubbed into Hindi as Mera Faisla by Wide Angle Media Pvt. Ltd. in 2016.

Plot
The film narrates the story of a youngster, who loves his almirah and what he does to achieve his goals in life. All he loves is an almirah! He discovers right from his childhood that it is the safest place to hide. And if one more name could be added to the cast of the film, you could safely add an almirah for the role it plays in the movie. Sanju (Sundeep Kishan) has an MA degree to boast of, but he is not interested in joining his father's business. His father Suryanarayana (Naresh) tries to put his son on track, and that changes Sanju's mission in life. He wants to get that girl who walks into a room, asks him to draw the curtain, and stuns him completely. Swathi (Surbhi) is furious when she gets to know Sanju's true identity. But Sanju has lost his heart to her. It's no joke getting any close to her because her father Adikeshavulu (Mukesh Rishi) is a powerful man, a murderer who runs an underground empire, and even controls politics. Imagine Sanju landing in Adikeshavulu's house! He does it. What takes him there is another story in itself. Suryanarayana is shell-shocked when his son tells him that he is in love with the don's daughter on the return. The father is flabbergasted. That's not all. Sanju opens the car boot and lo! What Suryanarayana finds there gives him the jitters! Sanju does the unthinkable all the time. If hiding in the almirah was what he did to escape punishment from his father as a child, it is the almirah, once again, that plays a crucial role in his reaching his life goal.

Cast
 Sundeep Kishan as Sanju
 Surbhi as Swathi
 Naresh as Suryanarayana, Sanju's father
 Mukesh Rishi as Adikeshavulu, Swathi's father
 Saptagiri
 Ajay
 Sivannarayana Naripeddi
 Shakalaka Shankar
 Venu Tillu

Soundtrack
The soundtrack was composed by S. Thaman.

Critical reception
The Times of India wrote "Beeruva is quite an entertainer, largely because of a well-scripted characterization for Sundeep Kishan’s role." Idlebrain wrote "Films like these should run of tight screenplay. It was the good screenplay that made Venkadri Express work big time, But, Beeruva didn’t boast of a good screenplay. We have to wait and see how family audiences embrace the movie."

References

Films scored by Thaman S
Indian romantic comedy films
2010s Telugu-language films